The 1985 Centennial Cup is the 15th Junior "A" 1985 ice hockey National Championship for the Canadian Junior A Hockey League.

The Centennial Cup was competed for by the winners of the Abbott Cup, Dudley Hewitt Cup, the Callaghan Cup, and a 'Host' team.

The tournament was hosted by the Orillia Travelways in the city of Orillia, Ontario.

The Playoffs

Round Robin

Results
Orillia Travelways defeated Cole Harbour Colts 8-1
Aurora Tigers defeated Penticton Knights 8-4
Penticton Knights defeated Cole Harbour Colts 9-6
Orillia Travelways defeated Aurora Tigers 11-3
Cole Harbour Colts defeated Aurora Tigers 7-5
Orillia Travelways defeated Penticton Knights 6-3

Semi-finals and Final

Awards
Most Valuable Player: Adam Lewis (Orillia Travelways)
Top Scorer: Joe Murphy (Penticton Knights)
Most Sportsmanlike Player: Joe Murphy (Penticton Knights)

All-Star Team
Forward
Adam Lewis (Orillia Travelways)
Danton Cole (Aurora Tigers)
Joe Murphy (Penticton Knights)
Defence
Jon Lawson (Orillia Travelways)
Tim Paller (Penticton Knights)
Goal
Dennis Schrapp (Orillia Travelways)

Roll of League Champions
AJHL: Red Deer Rustlers
BCJHL: Penticton Knights
CJHL: Pembroke Lumber Kings
IJHL: Charlottetown Eagles
MJHL: Selkirk Steelers
MVJHL: Cole Harbour Colts
NMJHL: Thompson King Miners
NOJHL: Sudbury Cubs
OJHL: Orillia Travelways
PCJHL: Prince George Spruce Kings
SJHL: Estevan Bruins

See also
Canadian Junior A Hockey League
Royal Bank Cup
Anavet Cup
Doyle Cup
Dudley Hewitt Cup
Fred Page Cup
Abbott Cup
Mowat Cup

External links
Royal Bank Cup Website

1985
Cup
Sport in Orillia